Sanford is a city in Lee County, North Carolina, United States. The population was 30,261 at the 2020 census. It is the county seat of Lee County.

History

Sanford was named for C.O. Sanford, a railroad civil engineer instrumental in the building of the rail lines through the area that formed the foundation of what became the city of Sanford.

Sanford is located in Lee County, North Carolina, which was formed from parts of the surrounding three counties in 1907. On creation of the new county, Sanford and Jonesboro were the major towns in the area. Rather than decide which would be the county seat, the decision was to place the county's new courthouse directly between the two towns. For decades, Lee County was the only county in the United States to have a courthouse with an RFD address. In the late 20th century Sanford had grown to such an extent that it eventually merged with Jonesboro. The town of Jonesboro became Jonesboro Heights, and the name of Sanford was kept for the town.

The general Sanford area played key roles in the Revolutionary and Civil Wars, specifically regarding sites like the House in the Horseshoe and Endor Iron Furnace. Over the following decades, the Sanford area became an important source of coal, brownstone, and brick. In particular brownstone and subsequent brick production made Sanford a key provider of these building materials for areas throughout the United States.

For seven seasons, 1941-42 and 1946-50, Sanford fielded a professional minor league baseball team. In 1941-42, the Sanford Spinners played in the Class D level Bi-State League. After the war, a new Spinners team was a member of the Class D level Tobacco State League from 1946 to 1950. Home games were played at Temple Park. Led by manager Zeb Harrington, the Spinners won the regular season pennant three times.

On April 16, 2011, a large tornado ripped through Sanford, demolishing a Lowe's hardware store and a warehouse, and destroying multiple homes and buildings before moving into Wake County.

On October 21, 2014, Sanford established a formal sister city relationship with Yixing, China. On October 5, 2019, Sanford established a formal sister city relationship with Atizapan de Zaragoza, Mexico.

The Buffalo Presbyterian Church and Cemeteries, Downtown Sanford Historic District, East Sanford Historic District, Euphronia Presbyterian Church, Farish-Lambeth House, Hawkins Avenue Historic District, Lee Avenue Historic District, Lee County Courthouse, Lee County Training School, John D. McIver Farm, Railroad House, Rosemount-McIver Park Historic District, Sanford High School, Former, Seaboard Milling Company, and Temple Theatre are listed on the National Register of Historic Places.

Geography

Little Buffalo Creek, a tributary of the Deep River, flows northward through the center of the city. Big Buffalo Creek flows through the west side of the city, and the entire city is part of the Cape Fear River watershed. Lick Creek and its tributaries drain the east side of the city.

Demographics

2020 census

As of the 2020 United States census, there were 30,261 people, 10,418 households, and 6,723 families residing in the city.

2009
As of the census of 2009, there were 29,922 people, which was a 28.9% increase from 2000. The population density was 1,243 people per square mile (372.5/km2). There were 9,223 housing units at an average density of 383.2 per square mile (147.9/km2). The racial makeup of the city was 55.87% White, 29.19% African American, 0.50% Native American, 1.06% Asian, 0.03% Pacific Islander, 11.93% from other races, and 1.41% from two or more races. Hispanic or Latino people of any race were 19.03% of the population.

There were 8,550 households, out of which 34.5% had children under the age of 18 living with them, 46.0% were married couples living together, 17.9% had a female householder with no husband present, and 31.0% were non-families. 26.1% of all households were made up of individuals, and 9.4% had someone living alone who was 65 years of age or older. The average household size was 2.64 people and the average family size was 3.15 people.

In the city, the population was spread out, with 27.1% under the age of 18, 10.5% from 18 to 24, 30.3% from 25 to 44, 19.9% from 45 to 64, and 12.2% who were 65 years of age or older. The median age was 33 years. For every 100 females, there were 97.5 males. For every 100 females age 18 and over, there were 94.8 males.

The median income for a household in the city was $34,804, and the median income for a family was $39,447. Males had a median income of $30,527 versus $23,393 for females. The per capita income for the city was $17,038. About 14.8% of families and 17.1% of the population were below the poverty line, including 21.4% of those under age 18 and 13.0% of those age 65 or over.

Economy
Sanford is geologically located above the meeting of white beach sand and Piedmont clay, enabling the city to be a producer of clay bricks. In 1959, Sanford produced 10 percent of the bricks in the United States and was named "Brick Capital of the USA". Brick production continues by manufacturers such as General Shale and Lee Brick and Tile.

Sanford produces textiles, and a Wyeth vaccine facility became the area's largest employer in 2006.

Arts and culture

Museums
 Railroad House Museum

Performing arts
 Temple Theatre

Government
Sanford operates under a council-manager government. The city council consists of the mayor and seven council members. Five of the council seats are ward (district) representatives, and two seats are citywide representatives elected at-large. Terms last four years and are staggered, with elections every two years.

Education
The Lee County campus of Central Carolina Community College CCCC is located in Sanford. CCCC awards degrees, diplomas and certifications in a variety of programs.

The Lee County Schools public school system contains three high schools, three middle schools, seven traditional elementary schools, one year-round elementary school, and one alternative school.

 The three high schools are Lee County High School, Lee Early College on CCCC's campus, and Southern Lee High School. Southern Lee High School and Lee Early College both opened during the 2005-2006 school year.
 The three middle schools are West Lee Middle School, East Lee Middle School and SanLee Middle School. SanLee Middle School opened in the 2008-2009 school year. 
 The alternative school, Bragg Street Academy, serves students in grades 6 through 12.
 The seven traditional elementary schools are B.T. Bullock Elementary, Broadway Elementary, Deep River Elementary, Greenwood Elementary, J. Glenn Edwards Elementary, J.R. Ingram, Jr, and W.B. Wicker. Elementary. The year-round elementary school, Tramway Elementary, operates on a lottery.

There are three public charter schools. MINA Charter serves students in kindergarten through 5th grade. Ascend Leadership Academy and Central Carolina Academy serve students in 6th through 12th grades.

There are two private Christian schools, serving preschool through 12th grade: Grace Christian and Lee Christian.

Media

Newspapers
The city's newspaper of record is The Sanford Herald, which has published continuously since 1930. The newspaper is owned by Paxton Media Group, based in Paducah, Kentucky. The Herald is a five-day-a-week morning newspaper and is a member of the Audit Bureau of Circulations and of the North Carolina Press Association. 

"The Rant" was founded in 2008 by former journalists with experience at several print publications, including The Sanford Herald. Initially a radio show, it became an online news site in 2014. In 2019, it began publishing a monthly print edition.

Radio stations
 WFJA Classic Hits and Oldies 105.5 FM - classic hits and oldies
 WWGP 1050 AM Today's Best Country – country, The Swap Shop and local news
 W204AV 88.7 – Christian
 WDCC 90.5 – variety (owned by Central Carolina Community College)
 WLHC 103.1 – pop standards
 WDSG 107.9 – beach, oldies, and gospel
 WXKL 1290 – gospel

Infrastructure

Transportation

Air
The airport opened in 2000, replacing the Sanford Lee County Brick Field, and provides both recreational and corporate services.

Designated routes and highways

 United States Highways:
 U.S. 1, known also in parts as Jefferson Davis Hwy and Hawkins Avenue (U.S. Bus 1)
 U.S. Route 15
 U.S. Route 421, known as Horner Boulevard
 U.S. Route 501
 North Carolina Highways:
 N.C. Route 42
 N.C. Route 78
 N.C. Route 87

Commercial rail service
 CSX Transportation
 Norfolk Southern Railway
 Atlantic and Western Railway short line.
 Atlantic and Yadkin Railway

Public transit
The  County of Lee Transit System (COLTS) is a coordinated transit system that provides transportation services in Sanford and Lee County.

Bicycle and pedestrian
 The Maine-to-Florida U.S. Bicycle Route 1 passes through downtown Sanford and Lee County.
 A half-mile greenway trail is located in the Kiwanis Family Park with additional mileage under development.

Notable people
 Hardy Boyz, WWE wrestlers (older brother Matt was born in a Sanford hospital, and both lived there for a few months)
 Bill Briggs, NFL defensive end
 Britton Buchanan, runner-up on the fourteenth season of The Voice
 Floyd Council, blues musician
 Lita (Amy Dumas), former WWE Diva; now resides in Atlanta, Georgia
 Bill Harrington, MLB pitcher
 J. D. McDuffie, NASCAR driver
 Wayne Judd, Celebrity Chef, star of CookItUp! With Chef Wayne television, former principal trumpet Lee County Community Orchestra, former youth pastor Abundant Life Christian Center
Jack Pittman, illustrator and cartoonist
 ACHES (Patrick Price), professional eSports player, best known for playing Call of Duty
 Robert T. Reives II, member of the North Carolina House of Representatives
 Herb Thomas, NASCAR driver
 Dennis Wicker, former lieutenant governor; partner at Nelson Mullins Law Firm; board member of Coca-Cola Consolidated and First Bank

Sister city
Sanford has two sister cities, as designated by Sister Cities International:
 Yixing, Jiangsu, China
 Atizapán de Zaragoza, State of México, Mexico

References

External links

 Sanford Area Chamber of Commerce
 

Cities in North Carolina
Cities in Lee County, North Carolina
County seats in North Carolina